Al-Hakim II (died 1352) was the fifth Abbasid caliph of Cairo for the Mamluk Sultanate (1341–1352).

Life 

He was son of al-Mustakafi. He took the office at the beginning of the month of Muharram in 742 AH, as Sultan al-Nasir Muhammad ibn Qalawun had recommended this, and  al-Mustakfi had entrusted the succession after him to his son Ahmed, as he did not recognize the abdication of his nephew Ibrahim. When he took the order of the Sultanate. They held a council on Thursday the eleventh of the month of Dhu al-Hijjah in 741, and asked the Caliph Ibrahim and the Crown Prince and the magistrate Ahmed, and said: Who deserves the succession legitimacy? Ibn Qayyud said: The deceased caliph who died in the city of Qus recommended after him the succession of his son Ahmed, and I test it forty times in the city of Qus, and this proved to me after his confirmation at my deputy in the city of Qus. The Caliph Al-Hakim II died in the middle of 1352 CE (753 AH) with plague.

References

Bibliography

1352 deaths
Cairo-era Abbasid caliphs
14th-century Abbasid caliphs
Year of birth unknown
Sons of Abbasid caliphs